The Triumph TR4A is a sports car built by the Triumph Motor Company at its Coventry factory in the United Kingdom between 1965 and 1967.

The TR4A was an evolution of the Giovanni Michelotti styled TR4. The car had been favourably received for its overall performance and many amenities but criticized for its harsh ride. The TR4's Hotchkiss drive system was replaced with an independent rear suspension, indicated by an "IRS" badge attached to the TR4A's rear.

Changes from the TR4

The new rear suspension was a semi-trailing arm system with coil springs and lever-arm shocks. This system more closely resembled that of the Triumph 2000 than the swing axle systems used in the Herald or Spitfire. The chassis was redesigned to accommodate the new suspension at the rear, with extensive changes to the side members and cross-bracing. The redesign had the desired effect, with reviewers commenting on the improved ride comfort, although some felt that the car's handling had not improved.

The chassis revisions resulted in a car roughly  wider than the TR4, although length and height were unaffected. The wheelbase was  shorter.

Although consideration was given to both an enlarged 2.5 liter four-cylinder or a six-cylinder engine, the TR4A used the same long-stroke, high-torque Standard four-cylinder wet-sleeve engine seen in the TR4.

Apart from the increase in width and the IRS badge on the rear of the car, other changes included a revised grille and new bonnet badge. There was also a new line of chrome trim on the side, starting near the rear edge of the door and ending at the front of the car with integrated signal/marker lights, which were moved from their earlier position in the corners of the grille. New smaller front bumpers and a convertible top patterned after the one from the Herald completed the exterior differences. On the interior the fly-off handbrake lever was moved to the transmission tunnel between two revised seats, the gearshift lever was shortened and the white painted steel dashboard was now always covered by walnut, which had been optional in the TR4.

In 1965 the TR4A IRS sold in the UK for approximately £968. Wire wheels added £36, overdrive £51, heater £13 and seat belts £4 each;.

Coachwork 
The TR4A continued to offer the "Surrey Top" hard top system as an option. This weather protection system comprises a rigid rear back light, a removable rigid roof panel and a soft fabric panel that was the actual surrey-top. The back light is attached to the rear of the passenger area semi-permanently. Either the roof panel or the soft surrey top bridge the gap between the top of the windshield surround and the top of the back light. This aesthetically foreshadowed the silhouette of Targa top cars.

Non-IRS 
In response to requests from United States distributors Bud Forman and Les Genser Triumph developed a version of the TR4A fitted with a TR4-style rear live axle and made IRS an extra-cost option for that market. To locate the newly re-introduced leaf springs, spring brackets were added to the revised chassis. Live axle cars received a commissioning number (Triumph did not use serial numbers) that started with "CT". This was the same prefix used for TR4s. IRS equipped cars' commissioning numbers began with "CTC". The price in the United States was just under $2500.

Motorsports 
Even though the SCCA declined to homologate the TR4A in 1965, Kas Kastner, Triumph's US Competition Manager, and his modified "Super Stock" TR4A were able to win a D-modified National Championship in 1965 at Daytona with driver Charlie Gates.

Bob Tullius' Group 44 and others successfully campaigned these cars during the 1965 to 1973 seasons, accumulating a respectable collection of finishes.

The apex of the TR4A's racing history is the team win by three TR4A IRS models at the Sebring 12-hour race of 1966, finishing 1st, 2nd and 3rd in their class.

Successor 

In 1968 the TR4A's venerable four-cylinder engine was replaced by Triumph's 2.5-litre straight-6. In the UK and most other markets it was equipped with Lucas fuel injection and called the TR5. In the United States price pressure and tighter emissions standards resulted in an otherwise identical but much less powerful car being fitted with twin Zenith-Stromberg carburettors, called the TR250.

Survivors 
In Q1 2011 there were approximately 789 licensed and 153 SORN TR4As registered with the DVLA.

Specifications 
Engine: , 4 cylinders inline, 86 mm bore, 92 mm stroke, 9:1 compression ratio, .
Turning circle: 
Capacities:
Fuel tank: 
Engine sump: 
Gearbox: 
Acceleration in top:
: 8 s
: 8 s
: 11 s

References

External links

TR4A
Sports cars
Cars introduced in 1965
Cars discontinued in 1967
Roadsters
Rear-wheel-drive vehicles